Alain Portmann (born 14 February 1981) is a Swiss football goalkeeper, who currently plays for FC Breitenrain (as of 2009–10 season).

He won promotion to Swiss Super League with SR Delémont in 2002.

References

1981 births
Living people
Swiss men's footballers
Switzerland under-21 international footballers
SR Delémont players
Yverdon-Sport FC players
FC Thun players
FC Solothurn players
FC Concordia Basel players
Swiss Super League players
Association football goalkeepers